Still Within the Sound of My Voice is the thirteenth album by American singer-songwriter Jimmy Webb, released on September 10, 2013. The album features fourteen classic Jimmy Webb songs performed by Webb with guest appearances by friends, collaborators, admirers, and fellow recording artists Lyle Lovett, Carly Simon, The Jordanaires, Keith Urban, Rumer, David Crosby and Graham Nash, Joe Cocker, Marc Cohn, Justin Currie, America, Kris Kristofferson, Amy Grant, Brian Wilson and Art Garfunkel.

Critical reception

In his review for Rolling Stone magazine, Anthony DeCurtis gave the album four out of five stars, calling it an "equally appealing follow-up to Webb's 2010 release Just Across the River." DeCurtis goes on to write:

DeCurtis notes that producer Fred Mollin's "atmospheric, country-tinged settings" provide the album with a consistency that unifies the diverse sounds of the featured artists and the selection of songs that span several decades. The highlight of the album for DeCurtis is MacArthur Park, here given new life by Brian Wilson's "Beach Boys-style backing vocals, Molin's Americana touches and Webb's own craggy recitation"—all serving to capture the "timelessness" of this classic song.

PopMatters music journalist Neil Kelly wrote, "The most praise goes to Webb himself, showing incredible vocal range for his age. His abilities to mesmerize are none diminished, and this benefits a few of the songs as some of his collaborators clearly are having a hard time keeping up."

Track listing

Personnel

Music
 Jimmy Webb – composer, piano 
 America – featured artist  
 Joe Cocker – featured artist  
 Marc Cohn – featured artist  
 David Crosby – featured artist  
 Justin Currie – featured artist  
 Art Garfunkel – featured artist  
 Amy Grant – featured artist  
 The Jordanaires – featured artist  
 Kris Kristofferson – featured artist  
 Lyle Lovett – featured artist  
 Graham Nash – featured artist  
 Rumer – featured artist  
 Carly Simon – featured artist  
 Keith Urban – featured artist  
 Brian Wilson – featured artist, backing vocals
 Fred Mollin – electric guitar, organ, percussion, synthesizer, backing vocals  
 Pat Buchanan – electric guitar  
 Jerry Douglas – dobro  
 Paul Franklin – dobro, steel guitar  
 Bryan Sutton – banjo, acoustic guitar, mandolin  
 John Willis – banjo, acoustic guitar, electric guitar  
 Stuart Duncan – fiddle, mandolin  
 Matt Rollings – organ, piano, synthesizer, Wurlitzer  
 Jeff Taylor – accordion  
 Larry Paxton – bass  
 Greg Morrow – drums  
 Jaime Babbitt – backing vocals  
 Jeffrey Foskett – backing vocals  
 Jim Parr – backing vocals  
 Russell Terrell – backing vocals

Production
 Fred Mollin – producer
 Jake Burns – engineer
 Gary Griffin – engineer
 Kyle Lehning – engineer, mixing
 Glen Marchese – engineer
 Jim Parr – engineer
 "Teenage" Dave Salley – engineer, overdub engineer
 Jesse String – engineer
 Ben Wisch – engineer
 Casey Wood – engineer
 Greg Calbi – mastering
 Jessica Daschner – photography
 Paul Grosso – art direction, design
 Steve Blackmon – assistant
 Rich Hansen – assistant
 Laura Savini – marketing
 David Simoné – management
 Winston Simone – management

References

2013 albums
E1 Music albums
Jimmy Webb albums